In molecular biology, the engrailed homeobox proteins are a family of homeobox proteins which are characterised by the presence of a region of some 20 amino-acid residues located at the C-terminal of the 'homeobox' domain. This region forms a signature pattern for this subfamily of proteins.

References

Protein domains